Mohawk Road is an arterial road in Hamilton, Ontario, Canada, running through the Ancaster and Upper City (mountain) districts, and has two distinct segments. The western segment begins as a continuation of Rousseaux Street in Ancaster just west of the interchange with Highway 403 and the Lincoln M. Alexander Parkway (The Linc), and travels eastward to the interchange with the two freeways, defaulting into the latter. The eastern segment begins as a continuation of Golf Links Road (which runs east from Meadowlands) at the same interchange near the Iroquoia Heights Conservation Area, and runs parallel with the Linc, cuts across the Hamilton mountain and ends at Mountain Brow Boulevard, the site of Mohawk Sports Park.

History

Mohawk Road, is a road that follows the route of the Algonquian and Iroquoian Great Trail that passed through dense forest. First Nation inhabitants in the area walked this path from upper New York State.

The first area of Hamilton mountain to be settled was by the Pennsylvania Dutch Loyalists at present-day Mohawk Road, west of Upper James Street, which runs to the mountain brow between Queen Street and the Sanatorium. Upper James Street at the time was known as the Caledonia Highway.

In 2019, there was a proposal to remame the Ancaster portion that continues from Rousseaux Street, to Rousseaux Street; to avoid confusing motorists since the street was broken due to the construction of the Linc. However, due to lack of enough support, the proposal was cancelled. Despite this, the exits for Mohawk Road on both Highway 403 and the Linc are today signed as Rousseaux Street.

Major intersections 
Note: Listing of streets from West to East.
Upper Paradise Road
Garth Street
West 5th Street
Upper James Street
Upper Wellington Street
Upper Wentworth Street
Upper Sherman Avenue
Upper Gage Avenue
Upper Ottawa Street
Upper Kenilworth Avenue
Mountain Brow Boulevard

See also
Niagara Escarpment Commission

References

MapArt Golden Horseshoe Atlas - Page 656/657/658 - Grids L8–K18

External links
Google Maps: Mohawk Road (Hybrid)

Roads in Hamilton, Ontario